Sir Harold Richter (17 January 1906 – 18 June 1979) was a member of the Queensland Legislative Assembly.

Biography
Richter was born at Ipswich, Queensland, the son of Federick Richter and his wife Pauline (née Rack). He attended school at Teviotville state school and Ipswich Grammar School, and became a farmer at Teviotville he later owned an agricultural, manufacturing and engineering business.

On 21 January 1933 Richter married Gladys Barbara James (died 1986) and together had two sons and two daughters. He died at Coorparoo in June 1979 and was Cremated at the Mt Thompson Crematorium.

Public life
Richter was the chairman of the Boonah Shire Council from 1943 until 1947.

At the 1957 Queensland state election, Richter, representing the Country Party, won the seat of Somerset at the 1957 Queensland state election. He held the seat until 1972.

He held the following roles in the Country Party and the Parliament:
 Vice-president of the Queensland Country Party 1951–1955
 President of the Queensland Country Party 1956–1960
 Minister for Public Works and Local Government 1961–1963
 Minister for Local Government and Conservation 1963–1969

References

Members of the Queensland Legislative Assembly
1906 births
1979 deaths
National Party of Australia members of the Parliament of Queensland
20th-century Australian politicians